The 1996–97 Israel State Cup (Gvia HaMedina) was the 58th season of Israel's nationwide football cup competition and the 43rd after the Israeli Declaration of Independence.

The competition was won by Hapoel Be'er Sheva who had beaten Maccabi Tel Aviv 1–0 in the final.

By winning, Hapoel Be'er Sheva qualified to the 1997–98 UEFA Cup Winners' Cup, entering in the qualifying round.

Results

Eighth Round

Round of 16

Quarter-finals

Semi-finals

Final

References
100 Years of Football 1906–2006, Elisha Shohat (Israel), 2006, p. 301
Israel Cup 1996/97 RSSSF

Israel State Cup
State Cup
Israel State Cup seasons